Larry Turner may refer to:

 Larry Turner (American football) (born 1982), American football player
 Larry Turner (politician) (1939–2009), American politician
 Larry Turner (basketball) (born 1982), American basketball player

See also
Lawrence Turner (disambiguation)